20 Dates is a 1998 American mockumentary film. Myles Berkowitz directs and stars as himself, a man who decides to combine "the two biggest failures in my life--professional and personal" by setting out on a filmed quest to have 20 dates and come out with both a movie career and a love interest. While most of his dates are disasters of varying stripes, Myles ultimately meets the lovely Elisabeth on his 17th date and they completely hit it off, leaving him with a new dilemma when he wants to finish the movie anyway and puts his new romance at risk.

Cast
 Myles Berkowitz as Myles
 Elisabeth Wagner as Elisabeth
 Richard Arlook as The Agent
 Tia Carrere as herself
 Robert McKee as himself
 Elie Samaha as The producer (voice)

Reception
The film received mixed reviews from critics. The aggregate review websites Rotten Tomatoes and Metacritic recorded scores of 35% and 36 out of 100, respectively.

Film critic Christopher Null of Filmcritic.com awarded the film four and a half stars out of five and called the film "hysterical" while Leonard Clady of Variety called it "a mockumentary of inordinate skill", concluding that it's "a satisfying and entertaining movie." James Berardinelli of ReelViews.net called the film "inconsequential" but, at the same time, admitted that some parts of the film are "often hilarious."

On the other hand, film critic Roger Ebert of Chicago Sun-Times awarded the film a half star out of a possible four stars, opining that "the film has the obnoxious tone of a boring home movie narrated by a guy shouting in your ear" and concluding by calling the film "incompetent and annoying." Jeff Millar of the Houston Chronicle said the film is "a joke" and that "Berkowitz is a rather annoying person".

See also
 Cinema of the United States
 List of American films of 1998

References

External links

 

1998 films
American mockumentary films
1990s mockumentary films
Fox Searchlight Pictures films
1998 comedy films
1999 comedy films
1999 films
1990s English-language films
1990s American films